The Kittitian Hill is a resort development in Saint Paul Capisterre Parish, Saint Kitts and Nevis. It is set on the hillside with 400 acres of steep contours and flat coastal plain on the north coast between Mount Liamugia and the Caribbean Sea. It was designed by Bangkok-based architect Bill Bensley.

History 
Kittitian Hill was founded in 2006 by Val Kempadoo, a Trinidad-based entrepreneur and leader in sustainability. It was funded by the Sugar Industry Diversification Foundation (SIDF) in 2011.

The SIDF's purpose is to provide support to the government in its efforts to diversify the national economy of St. Kitts and Nevis and maintain economic stability, and to support, finance or undertake the development of new and existing industries, projects or enterprises.

In July 2013, the SIDF sold its stake to Swiss Entrepreneur Patrick Liotard-Vogt making Kittitian Hill a private company. The mission of the SIDF was successfully fulfilled allowing them to invest just a few months later in Christophe Harbor, a marina project based in the south east peninsula.

Amenities and facilities 
Kittitian Hill is composed of various hospitality components

Belle Mont Farm: five star sustainable luxury hotel set on a tropical farm.
Yaya Grove: a collection of secluded villas.
Village Inn: situated at the heart of the village, it consists of a range of-title condominium apartments within the Kittitian Hill Village.
Golden Lemon: upscale beachfront property hotel on the beach at Dieppe Bay offering sea food restaurant, beach club and bar.
Mango Walk Spa: a destination spa in a forest of giant mango trees offering indigenous treatments.
Irie Fields: 18 hole Championship Golf Course designed by Ian Woosnam known as the most edible golf course in the world.

The first hotel, Belle Mont Farm is scheduled to open its doors in December 2014 along with The Kitchen Restaurant, The Mill Bar and the Red Rum Bar.

References

External links

Companies established in 2006
Companies of Saint Kitts and Nevis
Resorts in Saint Kitts and Nevis
2006 establishments in Saint Kitts and Nevis